Ruslan Alekseyevich Shumskikh (born 21 September 1974) is a former Russian professional football player.

Club career
He made his Russian Football National League debut for FC Lada Togliatti on 25 July 2006 in a game against FC Spartak Nizhny Novgorod.

External links
 

1974 births
Living people
Russian footballers
Association football goalkeepers
FC Neftyanik Ufa players
FC Lada-Tolyatti players
FC Neftekhimik Nizhnekamsk players